is an 18-volume bishōjo lolicon manga anthology series published by Animage Comics from November 10, 1982 to March 10, 1987. The first volume was released under the name , before the series was renamed to Petit Apple Pie with the original title as a subtitle.

The series primarily featured works from editors and contributors to the erotic lolicon magazine Manga Burikko, but did not itself include any erotic or pornographic stories.

Artists
Following is an alphabetical list of some of the artists who published stories in the Petit Apple Pie series.

Abyūkyo
Apple House
Yoshito Asari
Hideo Azuma
Chibakonami
Hisashi Eguchi
Kamui Fujiwara
Kasumi Gotō
Miki Hayasaka
Yōko Hino
Mochiru Hoshisato
Fujihiko Hosono
I.N.U
Jun Ishikawa
Akira Kagami
Megumi Kawaneko
Kei Kazuna
Marchen Maker
Meimu
Noa Misaki
Tōru Mizushima
Usagi Morino
Chimi Moriwo
Noriko Nagano
Ai Naniwa
Meiru Notsugi
Yukao Oki
Jun Saegusa
Yumi Shirakura
Yoshihisa Tagami
Chiko Takahashi
Yōsuke Takahashi
Miki Tori
Shinji Wada

References

1982 establishments in Japan
1987 disestablishments in Japan
1982 manga
Defunct magazines published in Japan
Lolicon
Men's magazines published in Japan
Magazines established in 1982
Magazines disestablished in 1987
Manga anthologies
Tokuma Shoten manga